Shilveh-ye Olya (also Romanized as Shīlveh-ye ‘Olyā; also known as Shelveh-ye ‘Olyā and Shīlveh-ye Bālā) is a village in Ojarud-e Sharqi Rural District, Muran District, Germi County, Ardabil Province, Iran. At the 2006 census, its population was 268, in 52 families.

References 

Towns and villages in Germi County